Locu Sinai Naique also known as Lucas de Sa was born in a  Konkani family of high social status that would convert to become Christian Brahmins on the islet of Chorão, in the former Portuguese Goa and Damaon. Nothing is known about his birth or death. The oldest document mentions his name first in the year 1527 and it is certain that in 1555 he was still living. The Portuguese referred to him as O Comprido (Indo-Portuguese; "the tall one").

Biography 
In the history of the Christianization of Goa by the Portuguese missionaries, one outstanding feature is the conversion of Locu Sinai Naique "the Greatest Giant of the Goan Brahmin Community".

Locu was one of the three most important and influential Brahmins of the Island of Chorão.<ref>Fr. Francisco de Souza Or Conq. P.I.C. Div I; para 43.</ref> One of these three named Crishna was the Tanador-mor (Village Judicial Authority) and Locu and Gopu were the other two. All these three held the first place among the Gauncares of Chorão Island.Locu was the rendeiro-mor (chief tax collector) of the state of Goa and this important post was held in the same high esteem as the one of tanador-mor (Village Judicial Authority)and therefore Crishna who was the tanador-mor and Locu both officials of the State enjoyed great prestige and had a powerful influence on the Gauncars to the extent of dissuading them from becoming Christians. Hence they were a great obstacle to evangelization in Goa, as is recorded in a letter written to King John III of Portugal by Martin Afonso de Melo on 6 November 1541.

 Conversion to Christianity
Locu was affluent and rich but wars reduced him to poverty and as he was unable to meet his commitments to the Treasury (the income of three years 3500 pardaus accruing from the provinces of Salsette and Bardez, he was put in jail.

Conveniently, a few days later Locu called for Father Antonio Gomes and asked to be baptized. This was an elegant way out of his difficult situation and the pending court cases for corruption, bribery and failure to pay his leaseholder obligations.

According to Bishop Juan de Albuquerque the "whip" of poverty and want was sent by God to move his heart.

Locu Sinai Naique's baptism took place on Sunday, 30 September 1548. Father Gaspar Berze (Barzeu) says in his letter "The Baptism took place in our college on a Sunday with a Solemn Mass and Sermon. The Governor Garcia de Sa stood as God Father whilst the baptising Minister was the Bishop Dom Frei de Albuquerque himself. Locu (who took the surname of his sponsor) was christened by the name of Lucas de Sa. His wife took the name of Donna Isabel and his nephew was named Dom Antonio. They were then carried on horse-back accompanied by all important people of the place who had come for the occasion and also by many Brahmins and they wended their way to the house of Rui Guimaraes and celebrated the occasion in a festive way. The whole city appeared to be celebrating a grand feast with the branches of pine trees at the church square of Rossio de Lisboa on Easter Sunday. For the Glory of God, the Festival was kept on for one full week. The Brahmins stated that since the father had turned a Christian, his sons too would do the same. As for Locu he said that 'more people would become Christians than the hair on his head'".

Locu rode on a well-dressed horse and with an escort consisting of the Portuguese Grandees went through the streets of the city which were well decorated and ornamented, receiving Vivas from the people whilst at the same time the bells were ringing merrily. The artillery too joined in the citywide rejoicing, but the most gratifying sounds to be heard were the voices of the Brahmins who in view of the fact that their chief had turned a Catholic thought that they too would do the same, and actually it did not take long for many to follow his example.

A letter (till now extant) written on the 13th of December 1548 by Fr. Gaspar Berze(Barzeu), S.J to the Jesuits in Coimbra registers the following “This Locu was a very  wealthy man. Every year his property gave him 6000 pardaus; he was very well treated by the Portuguese, performed on their behalf a lot of good work and was so liberal, that he was supposed to be spending 1000 pardaus, distributing much in alms giving. One of the things that God must have taken into account for him to become a Christian must have been his good deeds.

 Village judicial authority 
On the recommendation of Bishop Juan de Albuquerque  Locu was appointed  Tanador-mor (Village Judicial Authority); in addition to this many honors, privileges and favours were conferred upon him. But it must be added that the case against him continued.

 Descendants 
Due to the Chorão Epidemic in the 18th century, Locu's descendants left for Calangute in 1762 and settled there permanently in 1772. Among the direct male descendants of Locu Sinai there have been many priests, lawyers and doctors. Dr. Luis José Bras de Sà, the former Health Officer of Bardez, belonged to this family.

 References 
Footnotes

 Bibliography The Island of Chorão (A Historical Sketch); by Francisco Xavier Gomes Catão,  Mar Louis Memorial Press, Alwaye (1962)Missionary Tropics: the Catholic Frontier in India (16th-17th Centuries)''; by Ines G. Zupanov

People of Chorão (Island)
Converts to Roman Catholicism from Hinduism
16th-century Roman Catholics